Floyd is a masculine Anglo-Welsh given name deriving from the Welsh Llwyd (“gray, gray-haired”) and thus cognate with Lloyd.

Notable people with this name include:

 Floyd Abrams (born 1936), American attorney
 Floyd Bannister (born 1955), retired Major League Baseball pitcher
 Floyd Collins (1887–1925), American pioneer caver
 Floyd Council (1911–1976), American blues musician
 Floyd Cramer (1933–1997), American pianist
 Floyd Favors (born 1963), American boxer
 Floyd Gottfredson (1905–1986), American cartoonist best known for his work on the Mickey Mouse comic strip
 Floyd Heard (born 1966), American track and field sprinter
 Floyd Hudlow (1943–2021), American  football player
 Floyd Jones (1917–1989), American blues singer
 Floyd Landis (born 1975), American cyclist
 Floyd Levine (born 1932), American film and television actor
 Floyd Little (1942–2021), American football halfback
 Floyd Mayweather Jr. (born 1977), American five-division boxing champion
 Floyd Mayweather Sr., American welterweight boxer and trainer
 Floyd MacMillan Davis (1896–1966), American painter and illustrator 
 Floyd Odlum (1892–1976), American lawyer and businessman
 Floyd B. Olson (1891–1936), Governor of Minnesota
 Floyd Patterson (1935–2006), two-time world heavyweight boxing champion
 Floyd D. Rose, inventor of Floyd Rose guitar bridge
 Floyd Simmons (1923–2008), American athlete
 Floyd Simmons (American football) (1925–1996), American football player
 Floyd Smart (1894–1955), American athlete
 Floyd Talbert (1923-1982), member of Easy Company, Band of Brothers.
 Floyd Tillman (1914–2003), American country musician
 Floyd Vivino (born 1951), American comedian known as Uncle Floyd

Fictional characters:
 Dr. Floyd Charles, a character in the Left Behind book series
 Floyd Lawson, barber in the TV show The Andy Griffith Show
 Floyd Lawton aka Deadshot, supervillain/antihero assassin in DC Comics and enemy of Batman
 Floyd Malloy, antagonist in 1985 animated show M.A.S.K. (TV series)
 Floyd Pepper, a puppet character on the TV series The Muppet Show

Welsh masculine given names